Armscor refers to either:

Armscor (South Africa), the South African arms acquisition and sales agency
Armscor (Philippines), the Philippines-based manufacturer of weapons